Diplomatic Immunity is a Canadian political thriller film, released in 1991. It marked the narrative feature film debut of Sturla Gunnarsson.

The film stars Wendel Meldrum as Kim Dades, a Canadian diplomat working in El Salvador on a foreign aid program, who discovers that a community housing project paid for by the Canadian government has been overrun by the Salvadoran army. The cast also includes Michael Hogan as Jack Budyansky, a Canadian expatriate living in El Salvador; Michael Riley as Les Oberfell, an American who supports the Salvadoran army's fascist tactics; Ofelia Medina as Sara Roldan, a local matriarch and community worker; Pedro Armendáriz Jr. as Oswaldo Delgado, a Salvadoran politician who is far less interested in resolving the crisis than he appears to be; and Salvador Sánchez as Colonel Hernandez, the leader of the military contingent.

The film was shot primarily in Mexico, in conjunction with Estudios América. Written by Steve Lucas, who co-produced with Gunnarsson, the film personnel also included cinematographer Harald Ortenburger, composer Jonathan Goldsmith, film editor Jeff Warren, production designer Theresa Watcher, costumier Mónica Araiz and sound engineer José Antonio García. A young Alfonso Cuarón worked as first assistant director

The film garnered four Genie Award nominations at the 12th Genie Awards in 1991: two for Best Supporting Actor (Hogan and Riley), one for Best Supporting Actress (Medina), and one for Best Original Score (Jonathan Goldsmith).

References

External links

1991 films
Canadian thriller films
English-language Canadian films
Films shot in Mexico
Films set in El Salvador
Films directed by Sturla Gunnarsson
1991 thriller films
1990s Canadian films